Monsters! Monsters! is a role-playing game first published by Metagaming Concepts in 1976.

Description
Monsters! Monsters! is a fantasy system in which the player characters are monsters who prey on adventurers and the civilized world. The game's rules systems are essentially compatible with Tunnels & Trolls.

Publication history 
Monsters! Monsters! was designed by Ken St. Andre with Jim "Bear" Peters, with art by Liz Danforth, and was published in 1976 by Metagaming Concepts as a 40-page square-bound book. Monsters! Monsters!, St. Andre's third game, was developed by Steve Jackson based on a design by St. Andre related to his Tunnels & Trolls role-playing game. Metagaming Concepts released a second printing in 1976, which was saddle-stitched. Howard M. Thompson provided illustrations for Monsters! Monsters!

Flying Buffalo got the rights to reprint the first edition of Monsters! Monsters! in 1979.

In 2020 Ken St. Andre with Steve Crompton, Created and published an all-new 2nd edition of Monsters! Monsters! which was financed via a successful Kickstarter and published through Trollhalla Press Unlimited. That release also included a new 26 page gm adventure specially written for monster characters and the release of a new edition of The Toughest Dungeon in the World, a solitaire adventure also written especially for Monster characters.

Reception
Ronald Pehr reviewed Monsters! Monsters! in The Space Gamer No. 34. Pehr commented that "Monsters! Monsters!  is a good game for beginners, or anyone who wants to be a troll, but experienced gamers who enjoy complex campaign games offering more than bloodlust won't find anything they want here."

John ONeill of Black Gate commented that "The game is well written, with plenty of delightful Liz Danforth art, and my games library is no longer missing an important piece of gaming history."

References

Fantasy role-playing games
Flying Buffalo games
Metagaming Concepts games
Role-playing games introduced in 1976